Cell division control protein 6 homolog is a protein that in humans is encoded by the CDC6 gene.

The protein encoded by this gene is highly similar to Saccharomyces cerevisiae Cdc6, a protein essential for the initiation of DNA replication. This protein functions as a regulator at the early steps of DNA replication. It localizes in the cell nucleus during cell cycle phase G1, but translocates to the cytoplasm at the start of S phase. The subcellular translocation of this protein during the cell cycle is regulated through its phosphorylation by cyclin-dependent kinases. Transcription of this protein was reported to be regulated in response to mitogenic signals through a transcriptional control mechanism involving E2F proteins.

Interactions
CDC6 has been shown to interact with ORC1L, ORC2L, Cyclin A2, PPP2R3B, MCM3, PPP2R3A, MCM7 and PSKH1.

See also
Cdc6, the family of orthologs in eukaryotes

References

Further reading

External links